Patthar Ke Sanam is an 2019 Indian Bhojpuri-language action, romantic and drama film directed by Niraj Randhir and produced by Aditya Kumar Jha under the banner of "Rajgharana Films". It stars Arvind Akela "Kallu" and Yamini Singh in the lead roles while Awadhesh Mishra, Anita Rawat, Dev Singh, Prem Dubey, Sanjay Mahanand, Deepak Sinha, Roopa Singh and others play supporting roles.

Cast
Arvind Akela Kallu as Anand
Yamini Singh as Madhuri
Awadhesh Mishra as Raja Kashinath Singh
Anita Rawat as Kashinath's wife
Dev Singh as Vishwanath Singh
Prem Dubey as Prem Dubey (MLA of Munderava)
Sanjay Mahanand as Suman(Anand's friend)
Deepak Sinha as Anand's father
Roopa Singh
 Rohit Singh Matru

Music
The music of "Patthar Ke Sanam" is composed by Chhote Baba and Rajnish Mishra with lyrics penned by Rajesh Mishra, Sumit Singh Chandravanshi, Pyarelal Yadav and Irshad Khan Shikander. It is produced under the banner of "Worldwide Records" label.

First song of this film "Kaduwa Ke Rus ho" was released on 25 May 2019 at YouTube official handel of "Worldwide Records Bhojpuri". It was trending on YouTube.

Marketing
First look poster of this film was released on 18 May 2019

Trailer of this film was released on 18 May 2019 at official YouTube channel of "Worldwide Records Bhojpuri", who also bought his Digital satellite rights.

References

External links
 

2019 films
2010s Bhojpuri-language films